Saukko may refer to:

 Alvar Saukko (1929–2007), Finnish civil servant and politician
 , in service 1930–52
 , a fishing trawler in service 1955–85, a former Kriegsmarine ship